Valdesia is a monotypic genus of daesiid camel spiders, first described by Emilio Antonio Maury in 1981. Its single species, Valdesia simplex is distributed in Argentina.

References 

Solifugae
Arachnid genera
Monotypic arachnid genera